Mrs. Schuyler Van Rensselaer (Mariana Griswold) is a bronze sculpture by American artist Augustus Saint-Gaudens. It was designed in 1888 and cast in 1890. This artwork portrays the American author, art critic, and reformer Mariana Griswold Van Rensselaer (1851–1934), who "championed Saint-Gaudens in articles on his public monuments and relief sculptures".

The inscription on the upper center of the sculpture,  ("the spirit, not the work") is a reference to Mrs. Van Rensselaer's "high-minded aesthetic ideals".

The work was given in 1917 by the sitter to the Metropolitan Museum of Art.

References

External links 
 Mrs. Schuyler Van Rensselaer on Metropolitan Museum of Art

19th-century sculptures
Bronze sculptures in New York City
Sculptures by Augustus Saint-Gaudens
Sculptures of the Metropolitan Museum of Art
Sculptures of women in New York City